Yoder's Mill Historic District encompasses a historic archaeological complex near Hickory in Catawba County, North Carolina. It also includes the ruins of a mill complex built in the early 20th century. Its features include the remains of two dams (one wooden and the other masonry), a  millrace, and the stone wall remnants of a grist mill.

The district was listed on the National Register of Historic Places in 1980.

See also
National Register of Historic Places listings in Catawba County, North Carolina

References

Archaeological sites on the National Register of Historic Places in North Carolina
Buildings and structures completed in 1880
Catawba County, North Carolina
Historic districts on the National Register of Historic Places in North Carolina
National Register of Historic Places in Catawba County, North Carolina